Philip VI may refer to:

 Philip VI of France (1293–1350)
 Philip VI, Count of Waldeck (1551–1579)
 Felipe VI of Spain (born 1968)
 Andriscus (died 146 BC)